Parke Edward Coleman (December 1, 1901 in Canby, Oregon – August 5, 1964 in Oregon City, Oregon) was a professional baseball player who played Major League Baseball for the Philadelphia Athletics from 1932 to 1935 and the St. Louis Browns from 1935 to 1936.  The brother of long-time Oregon State head baseball coach Ralph Coleman, he played in college for Oregon State University and made his major league debut on April 15, 1932.

Coleman was a pinch hitter and, in his role as a substitute batter for the St. Louis Browns during the 1936 season, led the American League in number of times sent in to pinch hit (62 at bats) and in the number of hits as a pinch hitter (20 hits, for a .323 batting average). However, his major league career ended after the 1936 season, despite having a .292 batting average. He did play in the minors from 1937-1941, but injuries did force him to retire from professional baseball in 1941.

In a 5-year, 439 game career, Coleman compiled a .285 batting average (381-for-1337) with 193 runs, 40 home runs and 246 RBI. On August 17, 1934, as a member of the A's, he hit 3 home runs against the White Sox in a 9-8 win.

External links

Baseball Almanac – Ed Coleman stats

References

1901 births
1964 deaths
Major League Baseball right fielders
Philadelphia Athletics players
St. Louis Browns players
Oregon State Beavers baseball players
Baseball players from Oregon
Sportspeople from Canby, Oregon
Sportspeople from the Portland metropolitan area
Twin Falls Bruins players
Idaho Falls Spuds players